Anthony Watts (born 7 January 1950) is a British biochemist and Professor of Biochemistry at the University of Oxford and C W Maplethorpe Fellow in Biological Sciences and tutor at St. Hugh's College, Oxford. He is a fellow of the Royal Chemical Society, the Institute of Physics, Royal Society of Biology and Biophysical Society. He was managing director of the European Biophysics Journal, and is a co-opted member of the European Biophysical Societies' Association (EBSA), chair of the British Biophysical Society and chair of the Scientific Committee for the IUPAB/EBSA/BBS/IoP Biophysics congress, 2017. He was President of EBSA (2017-2019) and elected President-elect of IUPAB in 2021.

Education
Anthony Watts was educated at Knighton-upon-Teme Primary School (1954–1959); Tenbury Wells C of E Primary School(1959–1961) Ludlow School in Shropshire (1961–1968) and at the Astbury Department of Biophysics University of Leeds where he obtained his BSc (Hons) and subsequently his PhD in 1975.

Research
Since his PhD, Tony Watts has had an interest in both model and biological membranes, using a wide range of biophysical methods to characterize vesicular, model, reconstituted and natural membranes. In early work, lipid-protein interactions were investigated exploiting ESR approaches to relate lipid dynamics to function. In Oxford, newly developed wide-line NMR was developed to characterize surface specificity of lipid-protein and peptide interactions in membranes. More recently, novel solid state NMR approaches have been developed and exploited to resolve high resolution conformational and dynamic details directly of ligand-targets interactions in the absence of target structure, with GPCRs being the current focus. He has published using a wide range of biophysical methodologies, with a focus on understanding structural explanation of biological function – https://scholar.google.com/citations?user=dsSTSaIAAAAJ

Awards and honours
2015 Royal Society of Chemistry Interdisciplinary Prize ; 2015 Biophysical Society Anantrace Membrane Protein Award and Prize; XXV Godnev Annual Lecture and Award, National Academy of Sciences, Belarus (2014); “Frontiers in Sciences” Lecturer (2008), Texas A&M University, USA; Distinguished Professor, Kyun-won University, Seoul, Korea (2004); International Advisor, Korea Research Institute of Bioscience and Biotechnology (KRIBB) (2004 on); Hascoe Medal Lecturer, University of Connecticut, USA (2004); Royal Society of Chemistry Award for Biomembrane Chemistry for 2001; Moses Gomberg Lecturer, University of Michigan, USA (2001); Wilsmore Fellowship to the School of Chemistry, University of Melbourne, Australia (2000); The 1998 ANZMAG Lecturer; The Biochemical Society (UK) Morton Lecturer (1999); The Pfizer Lecture, University of Sheffield (1992); SERC-CNRS Maxime Hanss Prize for Biophysics (1992); Fulbright Scholarship (1987–88); 350th Commemorative Medal, Helskini University, Finland (1990).

References
 Watts, A. (2012) Exploiting magnetic resonance spectral anisotropy averaging to gain biological details in biomembranes. Encyclopaedia of Magnetic Resonance – Historical Perspectives  (E. D. Becker, Editor) Wiley Interscience

1950 births
Living people
British biochemists
Alumni of the University of Leeds
Fellows of St Hugh's College, Oxford